Urdaneta, officially the City of Urdaneta, is a 2nd class component city in the province of Pangasinan, Philippines. According to the 2020 census, it has a population of 144,577 people.

History
Urdaneta City was founded on January 8, 1858, by Pangasinenses and Ilocanos who sought greater ties and unity. The city was named after Father Andrés de Urdaneta, a famous aide of Magellan, who was a soldier, navigator, cosmographer, and evangelist. Father Urdaneta played a significant role in the colonization of the Philippines, as he helped establish the first Spanish settlement on the island of Cebu in 1565. He also helped establish the first trade route between Mexico and the Philippines, which was used for over two centuries.

By naming the city after Father Urdaneta, the people of Urdaneta City pay tribute to his legacy and contributions to the country. His name has become synonymous with exploration, adventure, and faith, all of which are qualities that are celebrated in Urdaneta City. Today, the city continues to honor Father Urdaneta through various events, monuments, and institutions, which serve as reminders of his enduring legacy.

Cityhood

In 1998, the Philippine Congress passed R.A. 8480, which converted the Municipality of Urdaneta into a component city of the Province of Pangasinan. The bill was sponsored by Rep. Amadeo R. Perez Jr., a congressman representing the province.

The passage of the bill was followed by a plebiscite, which was held on March 21, 1998. The people of Urdaneta overwhelmingly ratified the legislative act, with 26,222 in favor and only 142 against. As a result, Urdaneta was officially proclaimed as a city.

Geography
It has a land area of 12,100 hectares.

Barangays
Urdaneta is politically subdivided into 34 barangays. These barangays are headed by elected officials: Barangay Captain, Barangay Council, whose members are called Barangay Councilors. All are elected every three years.

Climate

Demographics

Religion

Roman Catholicism

The Urdaneta Cathedral or the 1858 Immaculate Conception Cathedral in Urdaneta is part of the Vicariate of Our Lady. Its vicar foranes are Rev. Fr. Alberto T. Arenos and Father Elpidio F. Silva Jr. Its feast day is December 8. Its head is Bishop Jacinto Agcaoili Jose, JCL, DD. Founded on January 8, 1858, it is under the jurisdiction of the Roman Catholic Archdiocese of Lingayen-Dagupan, Roman Catholic Diocese of Urdaneta.

The diocese is led by Bishop Jacinto Jose (born on October 29, 1950, in Mangato, Laoag City. He serves as vice chairman of the Catholic Bishops' Conference of the Philippines (CBCP) Episcopal Commission of Social Communications and Mass Media and member of the Episcopal Commission on Youth.
 	
Previous ordinaries were Bishop Jesus Castro Galang (December 7, 1991 – September 16, 2004) and Bishop Pedro G. Magugat, M.S.C. (April 22, 1985 – May 5, 1990). Other diocesan officials hold office at the Bishop's Residence and Chancery of Obispado de Urdaneta Building, Dr. Jose Aruego Street, Urdaneta, Pangasinan. The Vicar General is Msgr. Lazaro P. Hortaleza and Chancellor, Father Teofilo L. Calicdan.

Philippine Independent Church or Aglipayan Church
The Aglipay Central Theological Seminary (ACTS) in Urdaneta City, Pangasinan is the regional seminary of the church dedicated to serve the North-Central and South-Central Luzon Dioceses. ACTS offers a Bachelor of Theology and Divinity Programs for those who aspire to enter the ordained ministry in the Church. It is a four-year study program with a curriculum focused on biblical, theological, historical and pastoral studies with reference to parish management and development and wider cultural and social context. Members of the Philippine Independent Church or Aglipayans has the second most members in the city.

The Church of Jesus Christ of Latter-Day Saints
Urdaneta has been selected as the site of the Urdaneta Philippines Temple, the third temple of the Church of Jesus Christ of Latter-day Saints to be built in the Philippines (the other two being in Manila and Cebu City).

Economy

As Gateway to Northern Philippines, the city's strategic location is on the central part of eastern Pangasinan. Urdaneta is among the most progressive cities in Northern Luzon in annual regular income beating all cities in Region 1. It is among the region's cleanest, greenest and most livable cities.

Urdaneta produces rice, vegetables and noodles. As a trading hub of Pangasinan, it has a “Bagsakan” (trading post), a drop-off point for fruits and vegetables.

SM Prime Holdings will put up an SM Supermall to be called SM City Urdaneta Central, currently under construction and scheduled to open second half of 2017. The largest cattle market in Northern Luzon is Urdaneta's Livestock Market. The city has numerous financial and banking institutions which make it among the most vibrant economies in Pangasinan and the whole Ilocos Region.

Tourism
Attractions include Museo de Urdaneta, Cabaruan, Sugcong and Oltama Rolling Hills, inter alia. The Sanctuary I.T. Building (Barangay Nancaysan, MacArthur Highway, the only Philippine Economic Zone Authority (PEZA) proclaimed I.T. Building in Pangasinan) houses the first two call centers: FFG Telemarketing (a Filipino-Canadian outbound call center) and EIE Inc. (Filipino-owned website services marketing firm).

Government 
Urdaneta, belonging to the fifth congressional district of the province of Pangasinan, is governed by a mayor designated as its local chief executive and by a municipal council as its legislative body in accordance with the Local Government Code. The mayor, vice mayor, and the councilors are elected directly by the people through an election which is being held every three years.

Elected officials

Culture

Festivals
Urdaneta City celebrates Dumayo Festival annually March 18 – 31: Basbas ng Pag-iisang Dibdib (free mass wedding), bloodletting activity, tree planting for environment preservation, jobs fair and fun run for a cause.

The city celebrates fiesta every month of December. This is in remembrance of the city patron, Our Lady of the Immaculate Conception. Festivities are held December 1–8. Activities include a parade, drum and lyre competition, teachers' night, balikbayan night, ABC-SK night, ballroom, Miss Urdaneta City coronation night and many more events. A carnival is put up every December as a part of the event.

In the 2012 yearly City Fiesta celebration (December 1–15), Fifth District Representative Kimi S. Cojuangco formally (December 1) opened the agro-industrial fair where “bahay kubo” booths of the city's barangays showcased their products at the Urdaneta City Cultural and Sports Complex. Cojuangco was assisted by Manila Economic and Cultural Office Chair Amadeo R. Perez Jr., Mayor Amadeo Gregorio “Bobom” Perez IV and members of the Sangguniang Bayan led by Vice Mayor Onofre C. Gorospe.

Education

Elementary schools

Secondary schools

Colleges and universities

Notable personalities

 Danny Ildefonso, two-time PBA Season MVP, five-time Best Player of the Conference, three-time Finals MVP, All-Star Game MVP, Rookie of the Year, Comeback Player of the Year, eight-time PBA Champion and one of the 40 Greatest Players in PBA History.
 Isidro Lapena, present commissioner of Bureau of Customs
 Barbara Perez, award-winning actress known as the Audrey Hepburn of the Philippines.
 Lolita Rodriguez, award-winning actress.
 Romeo de la Cruz, former Solicitor General of the Philippines.

References

External links

 City Profile at the National Competitiveness Council of the Philippines
 Urdaneta at the Pangasinan Government Website
 Local Governance Performance Management System
 [ Philippine Standard Geographic Code]
 Philippine Census Information

 
Cities in Pangasinan
Populated places established in 1858
1858 establishments in the Philippines
Component cities in the Philippines